The 1994 NCAA Men's Water Polo Championship was the 26th annual NCAA Men's Water Polo Championship to determine the national champion of NCAA men's collegiate water polo. Tournament matches were played, for the last time, at the Belmont Plaza Pool in Long Beach, California during December 1994.

In a rematch of the previous year's final, Stanford defeated USC in the final, 14–10, to win their eighth national title. The Cardinal (27–1) were coached by Dante Dettamanti.

The Most Outstanding Players of the tournament were Jack Bowen, Jeremy Laster, and Frank Schneider, all from Stanford. All three, along with five other players, comprised the All-Tournament Team.

The tournament's leading scorer, with 11 goals, was Doug Munz from Navy.

Qualification
Since there has only ever been one single national championship for water polo, all NCAA men's water polo programs (whether from Division I, Division II, or Division III) were eligible. A total of 8 teams were invited to contest this championship. The following year, the field would decrease from 8 to 4.

Bracket
Site: Belmont Plaza Pool, Long Beach, California

{{8TeamBracket-Consols
| team-width=150
| RD3=First round
| RD4=Championship semifinals
| RD2=Consolation semifinals
| RD5=Championship
| RD5b=Third place
| RD1=Fifth place
| RD1b=Seventh place

| RD3-seed1= | RD3-team1=Stanford | RD3-score1=20
| RD3-seed2= | RD3-team2=Air Force | RD3-score2=6
| RD3-seed3= | RD3-team3=UCLA (OT) | RD3-score3=8
| RD3-seed4= | RD3-team4=Pepperdine | RD3-score4=7
| RD3-seed5= | RD3-team5=USC | RD3-score5=15
| RD3-seed6= | RD3-team6=Navy | RD3-score6=5
| RD3-seed7= | RD3-team7=California | RD3-score7=12
| RD3-seed8= | RD3-team8= Massachusetts | RD3-score8=7

| RD4-seed1= | RD4-team1=Stanford | RD4-score1=9
| RD4-seed2= | RD4-team2=UCLA | RD4-score2=5
| RD4-seed3= | RD4-team3=USC | RD4-score3=11
| RD4-seed4= | RD4-team4=California | RD4-score4=6

| RD2-seed1= | RD2-team1=Air Force | RD2-score1=5
| RD2-seed2= | RD2-team2=Pepperdine | RD2-score2=10
| RD2-seed3= | RD2-team3=Navy | RD2-score3=11
| RD2-seed4= | RD2-team4=Massachusetts | RD2-score4=3

| RD5-seed1= | RD5-team1=Stanford | RD5-score1=14
| RD5-seed2= | RD5-team2=USC | RD5-score2=10

| RD5b-seed1= | RD5b-team1=UCLA | RD5b-score1=5
| RD5b-seed2= | RD5b-team2=California | RD5b-score2=8

| RD1-seed1= | RD1-team1=Pepperdine | RD1-score1=13
| RD1-seed2= | RD1-team2=Navy | RD1-score2=10

| RD1b-seed1= | RD1b-team1=Air Force | RD1b-score1=7| RD1b-seed2= | RD1b-team2=Massachusetts | RD1b-score2=5
}}

 All-tournament team Jack Bowen, Stanford (Most outstanding player)Jeremy Laster, Stanford (Most outstanding player)Frank Schneider, Stanford''' (Most outstanding player)
Brent Albright, California
Hrovje Cizmic, USC
Drew Netherton, USC
Scott Turner, UCLA
Wolf Wigo, Stanford

See also 
 NCAA Men's Water Polo Championship

References

NCAA Men's Water Polo Championship
NCAA Men's Water Polo Championship
1994 in sports in California
December 1994 sports events in the United States
1994